Pierre Adolphe Capelle (4 November 1775 – 4 October 1851) was a 19th-century French chansonnier, goguettier and writer.

Works 
First a chansonnier, he also composed many comédies en vaudeville as well as texts of circumstances :

1797: Bébée et Jargon, one-act rhapsody, in prose, mingled with couplets
1801–1802: Âneries révolutionnaires, ou Balourdisiana, bêtisiana, etc. etc. ect
1813: Elle et lui, one-act comedy mingled with vaudevilles, with Théaulon
1814: La Vieillesse de Fontenelle, one-act comédie-anecdote, with Henri-François Dumolard
1816: Gascon et Normand, ou les Deux soubrettes, one-act comedy, mingled with vaudevilles, with Emmanuel Théaulon
1816: La journée aux aventures, three-act opéra comique, in prose
1817: Les deux Gaspard, one-act comédie en vaudeville
1817: La Fête de la reconnaissance, impromptu in vaudevilles, with Nicolas Brazier
1818: Encore une folie ou La veille du mariage, one-act comédie en vaudeville, with Gabriel de Lurieu
1818: Contes, anecdotes, chansons et poésies diverses
1811: La Clef du Caveau
1820: L'Autre Henri, ou l'An 1880, comedy in 3 acts, in prose, with Théaulon and Fulgence de Bury
1820: L'Ermite de Saint-Avelle, ou le Berceau mystérieux, one-act vaudeville, with Théaulon
1822: Chanson de la berceuse du duc de Bordeaux
1824: Dictionnaire de morale, de science et de littérature, ou Choix de pensées ingénieuses et sublimes, de dissertations et de définitions
1824: Le Tambour de Logrono, ou Jeunesse et valeur, one-act historical tableau, mingled with couplets, with Paul Auguste Gombault
1826: Manuel de la typographie française
1826: La Veuve de quinze ans, one-act comédie en vaudeville, with Théaulon
 Chansonnier des Muses
1834: Abrégé de l'histoire de Paris
1850: L'Amitié, discours en vers libres
undated: Le 6 juin 1825. Rentrée de Charles X dans sa capitale après la cérémonie du sacre
undated: A-Propos sur le rétablissement du trône des Bourbons en France
undated: Couplets adressés par un grenadier de la Grande Armée à ses camarades
undated: Discours de Jérôme Farine, membre honoraire de la Société des forts de la Halle, à ses camarades et aux bouquetières de la rue aux Fers, réunis à la Courtille
undated: Ma profession de foi épicurienne, ronde de table
undated: Physiologie de la noce, ou C'est toujours la même chanson
undated: Tout roule dans ce monde

Bibliography 
 Claude Duneton, Emmanuelle Bigot, Histoire de la chanson française: De 1780 à 1860, 1998, 273 
 Paul Mironneau, Chansonnier Henri IV, 1999

References 

 

French booksellers
19th-century French dramatists and playwrights
French chansonniers
1775 births
People from Montauban
1851 deaths